John Hart (7 April 1928 – 10 June 2007) was a Scotland international rugby union footballer. Hart played as a Wing.

Rugby Union career

Amateur career

Hart played for London Scottish.

Hart had previously played for Edinburgh University and Watsonians.

Provincial career

He played for East Midlands.

International career

He was capped for  once, in 1951.

Administrator

Hart joined the International Rugby Board as an administrator. He served as Secretary from 1971 to 1986.

Outside of rugby

Hurdling

Hart represented Scotland in the 1950 British Empire Games at Auckland in the 440 yard hurdles.

References

1928 births
2007 deaths
Scottish rugby union players
Scotland international rugby union players
Rugby union wings
Rugby union players from Stirling (council area)
London Scottish F.C. players
Edinburgh University RFC players
Watsonians RFC players
Scottish male hurdlers
Athletes (track and field) at the 1950 British Empire Games
Commonwealth Games competitors for Scotland
East Midlands RFU players